Tarabya of Toungoo was viceroy of Toungoo from 1440 to 1446. Prior to Toungoo, he had held governorships at Amyint and Yanaung.

Brief
He was a son of Gov. Tarabya I of Pakhan, and younger brother of Queen Saw Min Hla. He was appointed governor of Amyint with the title of Tarabya in early 1434 by King Mohnyin Thado. In 1439, King Minye Kyawswa I succeeded the Ava throne, and appointed Tarabya governor of the strategic town of Yanaung in the Prome region as a step to regain Toungoo which had been in revolt since 1426.

In 1440, Tarabya partook in the Ava expedition to Toungoo that retook the region. For his success, Tarabya was appointed viceroy of Toungoo.

According to the Toungoo Yazawin chronicle, a court astrologer predicted in 1442 that the viceroy would die at midnight on 5th waxing of Tabodwe 807 ME (1 January 1446). Angered by the prediction, he sent the astrologer to jail. The chronicle continues that the viceroy died at the midnight of 1 January 1446 as he was taking a shower. His son Minkhaung succeeded, and freed the astrologer from jail.

Tarabya ruled for nearly six years. Tarabya was a brother-in-law of Crown Prince Minye Kyawswa of the Forty Years' War fame. Moreover, starting with the Maha Yazawin chronicle, all royal chronicles identify Tarabya of Toungoo as an ancestor (paternal great-great-great grandfather) of King Bayinnaung of Toungoo Dynasty.

Notes

References

Bibliography
 
 
 

Ava dynasty
1446 deaths
Year of birth unknown
14th-century births